Heretaunga is a suburb of the city of Upper Hutt, located in the lower (southern) North Island of New Zealand. The settlement, one of the older suburbs in the Hutt Valley, dates from the 1840s when European settlers sought country  sections. A prime example of a "leafy" suburb, Heretaunga includes quiet tree-lined streets. It is characterised by large houses, often  Edwardian or from the mid-20th century.

The suburb has numerous green spaces, most evident around the site of the Royal Wellington Wellington Golf Club and at Trentham Memorial Park. The Royal Wellington Golf Club has been based in Heretaunga since 20 November 1906 after acquiring 48.5 hectares of land from the Barton family (descendants of Richard Barton).

Heretaunga takes its name from one of the Māori names for the nearby Hutt River, originating from a Hawke's Bay district.

Heretaunga adjoins the suburb of Silverstream to its south-west, and the two are commonly thought of associated with each other. To the north-east lies Trentham. The Heretaunga Railway Station on the Hutt Valley Line serves the suburb.

Heretaunga as a  Māori name combines here, meaning "to tie up", and taunga, literally meaning "to be at home" - the name originated with a mooring place for canoes.

Demographics

Heretaunga had a population of 2,496 at the 2018 New Zealand census, an increase of 297 people (13.5%) since the 2013 census, and an increase of 273 people (12.3%) since the 2006 census. There were 930 households. There were 1,248 males and 1,248 females, giving a sex ratio of 1.0 males per female. The median age was 41.6 years (compared with 37.4 years nationally), with 474 people (19.0%) aged under 15 years, 426 (17.1%) aged 15 to 29, 1,062 (42.5%) aged 30 to 64, and 537 (21.5%) aged 65 or older.

Ethnicities were 81.1% European/Pākehā, 12.5% Māori, 5.9% Pacific peoples, 10.2% Asian, and 2.4% other ethnicities (totals add to more than 100% since people could identify with multiple ethnicities).

The proportion of people born overseas was 23.7%, compared with 27.1% nationally.

Although some people objected to giving their religion, 37.6% had no religion, 51.1% were Christian, 2.2% were Hindu, 0.5% were Muslim, 0.6% were Buddhist and 2.3% had other religions.

Of those at least 15 years old, 525 (26.0%) people had a bachelor or higher degree, and 327 (16.2%) people had no formal qualifications. The median income was $34,200, compared with $31,800 nationally. The employment status of those at least 15 was that 966 (47.8%) people were employed full-time, 267 (13.2%) were part-time, and 75 (3.7%) were unemployed.

Education

References

Suburbs of Upper Hutt
Populated places on Te Awa Kairangi / Hutt River